This Is Korea is a 1951 American documentary film about the Korean War. It was directed by John Ford with a screenplay by James Warner Bellah.

It was released theatrically by Republic Pictures.

Plot
The film features the exploits of US armed forces, notably the 1st Marine Division, 1st Marine Aircraft Wing, United States Seventh Fleet and US Army during the UN September 1950 counteroffensive, Second Battle of Seoul, UN offensive into North Korea and the Battle of Chosin Reservoir.

References

External links
 
 Complete copy of film at the Internet Archive

Films directed by John Ford
Documentary films about the Korean War
1951 films
Korean War films
Republic Pictures films
Trucolor films
Films about the United States Marine Corps
1951 documentary films
American documentary films
1950s American films